Koenraad Desiré Arthur (Koen) Crucke (born 11 February 1952 in Ghent) is a Belgian operatic tenor, politician, and actor of stage, television, and film. As an opera singer he has been particularly active at the Vlaamse Opera in Antwerp where he specializes in character roles. He has appeared in numerous musical theatre productions as well. Since 1990, he stars as Albert 'Alberto Vermicelli' Vermeersch on the long-running  Flemish-Belgian children's television series Samson en Gert. In 2009, Crucke told the Belgian newspaper Het Nieuwsblad, Albert is based upon the role of the gay hairdresser, he played in the movie Koko Flanel but does not reveal anything about the sexual orientation of Albert.

Filmography

Films

TV

Personal life
In 2004 he married his long-time partner; becoming one of the first Belgian celebrities to take advantage of the newly established Same-sex marriage laws in Belgium.

References

External links
Official Website of Koen Crucke

1952 births
Living people
Belgian operatic tenors
Belgian LGBT politicians
Belgian LGBT singers
Belgian gay musicians
Belgian gay actors
Gay singers
Gay politicians
Musicians from Ghent
20th-century Belgian male opera singers
20th-century Belgian male actors
21st-century Belgian male opera singers
21st-century Belgian male actors
Politicians from Ghent